Bloody Sunday was a massacre on 25 August 1968 when Soviet soldiers shot three unarmed civilians in Prostějov during Warsaw Pact invasion of Czechoslovakia. Nine others were injured.

Events
On 20 August 1968 armies of five states of Warsaw Pact invaded Czechoslovakia starting occupation of the country. On 25 August 1968 at 20 pm a large column of Soviet army was passing from Olomouc to Brno through Prostějov. Soldiers got strayed in streets of Prostějov as Czechoslovaks were modifying or removing traffic markings to disorient Soviets. Soviets passed through centre of town but due to missing signs they turned wrong way and circled around the city returning back on the access road from Olomouc. Soviet soldiers started to become nervous due to being disoriented. Near the  soldiers started shooting around, even though streets were full of people. Shooting resulted in blown-out shop windows, damaged facades of houses and death of three people.

Aftermath
The funeral services for the three people killed occurred on 29 August 1968. Thousands of people gathered in the center of the city for the funeral. Some were holding banners demanding the departure of the occupiers and condemnation of the shooting. The massacre was never investigated and Soviets called story of massacre a fabrication. It is unknown what caused the massacre and people who were shooting were never found.

References

Warsaw Pact invasion of Czechoslovakia
1968 in Czechoslovakia
Massacres in the Czech Republic
Prostějov